The following is a list of Monster Jam episodes that aired on Speed from 2003 until 2013, FS1 from 2014 to 2018 and NBC Sports for 2019. Original episodes aired on FS1 with repeats on FS2 and local FOX Sports affiliates. The Monster Jam contract with FS1 expired in 2018, with the show airing on NBC Sports beginning in 2019. In March 2022, episodes shifted from NBCSN to CNBC with the closure of NBCSN. In February 2023, a multi-year deal was signed for Monster Jam to air on MAVTV.

Series overview

Episodes

Special (2003)

Season 1 (2003–04)

Season 2 (2005)

Season 3 (2006)

Season 4 (2007)

Season 5 (2008–09) 
TV Announcers: Scott Douglass, Mark Schroeder, and Sara Dayley or Sharah or Megan Gunning

Season 6 (2009)
TV Announcers: Scott Douglass, Mark Schroeder, and Sara Dayley or Megan Gunning

Live special (2010)

Season 7 (2010)
TV Announcers: Scott Douglass and Mark Schroeder

Season 8 (2011)
TV Announcers: Scott Douglass and Mark Schroeder

Season 9 (2011–12) 
TV Announcers: Scott Douglass and Mark Schroeder

Season 10 (2012–13) 
TV Announcers: Scott Douglass and Mark Schroeder

Season 11 (2014)

Season 12 (2015)
TV Announcers: Scott Douglass and Frank Krmel

Special (2015)

Season 13 (2016)
TV Announcers: Scott Douglass and Bob Dillner

Special (2016)

Season 14 (2017)
TV Announcers: Ryan LaCosse and Todd LeDuc

Special (2017)

Season 15 (2018)
TV Announcers: Ryan LaCosse, Camden Murphy or Bryce Kenny, and Leslie Mears

Special (2018)

Season 16 (2019)
TV Announcers: Scott Jordan, Bryce Kenny or Morgan Kane, and Leslie Mears

Special (2019)

Season 17 (2020)
TV Announcers: Scott Jordan with Bryce Kenny or Bari Musawwir or Scott Buetow, and Leslie Mears or arena hosts
The international coronavirus pandemic caused the postponement or cancellation of all Monster Jam events from March 13 - October 24. To fill the full season NBCSN aired non-televised event footage from events across the US.

Season 18 (2021)
TV Announcers: Scott Jordan with Colt Stephens and Leslie Mears

Special (2021)

Season 19 (2022)
TV Announcers: Scott Jordan with Colt Stephens and Leslie Mears

Season 20 (2023)
TV Announcers: Scott Jordan and Bari Musawwir (Red Tour) and Leslie Mears and Adam Enticknap (Blue Tour)

List of Cities and Venues Televised

City (Last Televised):
Wichita, KS (2023)
Cleveland, OH (2023)
Pittsburgh, PA (2023)
Tampa, FL (2023)
Providence, RI (2023)
Indianapolis, IN (2023)
Sacramento, CA (2023)
Houston, TX (2023)
Milwaukee, WI (2023)
St. Louis, MO (2023)
Greensboro, NC (2023)
San Diego, CA (2023)
Salt Lake City, UT (2023)
Orlando, FL (2022)
East Rutherford, NJ (2022)
Syracuse, NY (2022)
Seattle, WA (2022)
Jacksonville, FL (2022)
Miami, FL (2022)
Detroit, MI (2022)
Anaheim, CA (2022)
Minneapolis, MN (2022)
Oakland, CA (2022)
Glendale, AZ (2021)
Atlanta, GA (2021)
Arlington, TX (2021)
Kansas City, MO (2020)
San Antonio, TX (2020)
Washington, DC (2020)
Tokyo, Japan (2019)
Las Vegas, NV (2019)
Nashville, TN (2019)
Cardiff, Wales (2019)
Cape Town, South Africa (2019)
Denver, CO (2019)
New Orleans, LA (2019)
El Paso, TX (2019)
Sydney, AUS (2018)
Foxborough, MA (2018)
Philadelphia, PA (2018)
Santa Clara, CA (2018)
Rosemont, IL (2018)
Fresno, CA (2017)
Grand Rapids, MI (2017)
Portland, OR (2017)
Reno, NV (2016)
Phoenix, AZ (2013)
Arnhem, NL (2013)
Baltimore, MD (2012)
Toronto, ON (2012)
Cincinnati, OH (2011)
Gothenburg, Sweden (2007)
Pontiac, MI (2006)
Montreal, QB (2006)
West Lebanon, NY (2003)

Venue (Last Televised):
Intrust Bank Arena (2023)
Rocket Mortgage Fieldhouse (2023)
PPG Paints Arena (2023)
Raymond James Stadium (2023)
Amica Mutual Pavilion (2023)
Lucas Oil Stadium (2023)
Golden 1 Center (2023)
NRG Stadium (2023)
Fiserv Forum (2023)
The Dome at America's Center (2023)
Greensboro Coliseum (2023)
Snapdragon Stadium (2023)
Vivint Smart Home Arena (2023)
Camping World Stadium (2022)
Rice-Eccles Stadium (2022)
MetLife Stadium (2022)
Carrier Dome (2022)
Lumen Field (2022)
TIAA Bank Field (2022)
LoanDepot Park (2022)
Ford Field (2022)
Angel Stadium (2022)
US Bank Stadium (2022)
Petco Park (2022)
RingCentral Coliseum (2022)
State Farm Stadium (2021)
Atlanta Motor Speedway (2021)
AT&T Stadium (2021)
Sprint Center (2020)
Alamodome (2020)
Capital One Arena (2020)
The MetLife Dome (2019)
Sam Boyd Stadium (2019)
Nissan Stadium (2019)
Arrowhead Stadium (2019)
Principality Stadium (2019)
Cape Town Stadium (2019)
Empower Field at Mile High (2019)
Mercedes-Benz Superdome (2019)
UTEP Sun Bowl Stadium (2019)
Mercedes-Benz Stadium (2019)
ANZ Stadium (2018)
Amalie Arena (2018)
Gillette Stadium (2018)
Lincoln Financial Field (2018)
Levi's Stadium (2018)
Allstate Arena (2018)
Bridgestone Arena (2018)
Save A Mart Center (2017)
Van Andel Arena (2017)
Georgia Dome (2017)
Moda Center (2017)
Reno-Sparks Livestock Events Center (2016)
The HHH Metrodome (2014)
Chase Field (2013)
The Gelredome (2013)
M&T Bank Stadium (2012)
Sun Life Stadium (2012)
Rogers Centre (2012)
Paul Brown Stadium (2011)
Qualcomm Stadium (2010)
Ullevi Stadium (2007)
Pontiac Silverdome ( 2006)
Olympic Stadium (2006)
RCA Dome (2005)
Lebanon Valley Speedway (2003)

References

External links
 https://web.archive.org/web/20120719033948/http://www.speedtv.com/programs/monster-jam
 http://www.monsterjam.com
 http://www.hulu.com/search?query=monster+jam&st=0&fs=null
 http://www.monsterjam.com/TV/

Lists of American non-fiction television series episodes